Henry Slater (died c. 1590) of Portsmouth, Hampshire, was an English politician.

Family
Slater died without any children to inherit from him. His next of kin was a Henry Atkinson.

Career
He was a Member (MP) of the Parliament of England for Portsmouth in 1571. He was Mayor of Portsmouth in 1558–9.

References

English MPs 1571
Mayors of Portsmouth
1590 deaths